Jan Włodarczyk (15 December 1919 – 4 September 1998) was a Polish footballer. He played in six matches for the Poland national football team from 1947 to 1948.

References

External links
 

1919 births
1998 deaths
Polish footballers
Poland international footballers
Place of birth missing
Association footballers not categorized by position